The Haliacmon–Aoös line was a proposed demarcation line in Greek foreign policy during the Great Eastern Crisis. It connects the Aegean Sea and the Ionian Sea along the rivers Haliacmon and Aoös.

References

Borders of Greece
History of Greece (1863–1909)
Greece–Ottoman Empire relations
Great Eastern Crisis
Charilaos Trikoupis